John Duncan Tate FRIBA (1880 - 28 November 1930) was an architect primarily based in London from 1905 to 1930 partnership with James Edwin Forbes.

Architectural career
He was articled to James Edmeston and Edward Gabriel from 1898 to 1901, and then assistant to James Edwin Forbes in Birmingham. In 1902 he became assistant to C.E. MacPherson where he remained until 1905 when he established the partnership of Forbes and Tate in London with James Edwin Forbes.

He was nominated LRIBA in 1910 and FRIBA in 1915.

Personal life
He was born in 1880, the son of Frederick Tate (b. 1848) and Alice Edith Duncan (1854 - 1946). He married Annie Stewart Holl, daughter of William Huet Holl of Assam and Retford, at St Margaret's Church, Lee on 22 June 1907 and they had one child, a daughter Phyllis Tate (1911 - 1987).

He died on 28 November 1930 at 16 St Andrews Mansions, Dorset Street, London, and left an estate valued at £2,970 7s 5d.

Works
Pollard's Wood House, Nightingale Lane, Chalfont St Giles 1906
The Sheiling, Chalfont St Giles 1907 (built as his own house)
The Pollards, Oval Way, Gerrards Cross
Brown Cottage, Oval Way, Gerrards Cross
Kimberley, Oval Way, Gerrards Cross
Pollards Park, Chalfont St Giles for Archibald Grove MP 1907
Pollards Wood Grange, Buckinghamshire ca. 1909
Little Pednor, Chartridge, 1910-12 (enlarged)
Brantfell, Gerrards Cross, ca. 1911
House at 40 Parkway, Gidea Park, Romford, ca. 1911
The Pillars, Northwood, London ca. 1911
Widenham House, West Common, Gerrards Cross
Paddock House, West Common, Gerrard's Cross. ca 1913
Baylins Farmhouse, Penn Road, Knotty Green 1919 (loggia addition)
War Memorial Hall, Ballinger, Buckinghamshire 1922
Barrington Court, Somerset 1921-25 (restoration)
Beechams, Barrington Court, Somerset 1921-25
House for J. Crook, Chalfont Road, Amersham 1928

References

1880 births
1930 deaths
British architects
Fellows of the Royal Institute of British Architects